NCDC may refer to: 
 National Climatic Data Center, the United States National Climatic Data Center in Asheville, North Carolina is the world's largest active archive of weather data
 National Capital Development Commission, an Australian Commonwealth Government body created to complete the establishment of Canberra as the seat of government
 National Collegiate Development Conference, an American ice hockey league run by the United States Premier Hockey League
 National Cooperative Development Corporation (India)
  National Centre for Disease Control (India)
 Nigeria Centre for Disease Control, a Nigerian public health institute
 North Cornwall District Council, Cornwall, UK